The Pointe de Bertol (3,499 m) is a mountain of the Swiss Pennine Alps, located south of Arolla in the canton of Valais. Its southern side overlooks the Bertol Pass.

The Bertol Hut (3,311 m) is located at the southern base of the peak.

References

External links
 Pointe de Bertol on Hikr

Mountains of the Alps
Alpine three-thousanders
Mountains of Switzerland
Mountains of Valais